Morten Loktu (born 18 September 1960) is a Norwegian businessperson.

He took the siv.ing. degree at the Norwegian Institute of Technology in 1984, and was hired as an engineer in Statoil in 1985. Since then he has been a director in the company, except for the years 2002 to 2004, when he was the chief executive of SINTEF.

He is chairman of the board of OG21, and a board member of the Norwegian University of Science and Technology and of the European Institute of Innovation and Technology.

He is a fellow of the Norwegian Academy of Technological Sciences.

References

1960 births
Living people
Norwegian businesspeople in the oil industry
Equinor people
Norwegian Institute of Technology alumni
Members of the Norwegian Academy of Technological Sciences